PJ Ward is a Gaelic footballer from County Westmeath, Ireland. He played inter-county football with three different counties in the 2000s. He first made his name with Westmeath underage teams helping them to win the Leinster Minor Championship in 2000, scoring 1-04 in the final against Dublin, he then played with New York in the Connacht Championship, before joining up with Offaly.

References

Year of birth missing (living people)
Living people
Kilbeggan Shamrocks Gaelic footballers
Westmeath inter-county Gaelic footballers
New York inter-county Gaelic footballers
Offaly inter-county Gaelic footballers
Shamrocks Gaelic footballers